Nemegos is an unincorporated place and community in geographic Halsey Township in the Unorganized North Part of Sudbury District in Northeastern Ontario, Canada. It is on the Nemegosenda River in the James Bay drainage basin, and also is on the Canadian Pacific Railway transcontinental main line, between the railway points of Devon to the west and Tophet to the east.

History
Nemegos was established in the 1890s as a sectional point on the CPR between the divisional points of Chapleau to the west and Cartier to the east.
The residents were a mix of native and European settlers, primarily Finnish people. The post office was opened in 1912 by S.A. Hatch. There was a store, hotel, bunkhouses and a one-room school. Some of the men worked on the CPR; however, most were logging contractors, producing axe ties under contract to Austin, Nicholson Ltd. of nearby Chapleau.

Transportation
Nemegos railway station is served by the Via Rail Sudbury – White River train.

References

External links
Nemegos at Ontario Ghost Towns; includes photos

Communities in Sudbury District
Ghost towns in Northern Ontario